NIRS may refer to:

Organizations
 National Indigenous Radio Service, Australia
 National Institute on Retirement Security, a research institute in the US
 National Institute of Radiological Sciences, a research institute in Japan
 Nuclear Information and Resource Service, an anti-nuclear group in the US

Other uses
 Near-infrared spectroscopy

See also
 NIR (disambiguation)